VP Records is an independent Caribbean-owned record label in Queens, New York. The label is known for releasing music by notable artists in reggae, dancehall and soca. VP Records has offices in New York City, Miami, London, Kingston, Tokyo, Johannesburg and Rio de Janeiro. Additionally, the label has established a presence in Toronto, Australia and New Zealand.

History
The VP Records label was founded in 1979 by the late Vincent "Randy" Chin and his wife Patricia Chin, who owned the Randy's Records store in Kingston, Jamaica (as seen in the 1978 film Rockers), as well as the Studio 17 recording studios. In the mid-1970s, the Chins moved to New York City, setting up a record store in Brooklyn called VP Records in 1975, from which they sold and distributed records. In 1979, they relocated the store to Jamaica, Queens. In 1993, the record label was formed after the success of the retail store. The name of the label is a product of the first letters in the founders' names.

The label established itself as one of the first and largest independent record labels for reggae and dancehall, and with the popularity of the riddim sound of the early 2000s, the label achieved worldwide success for artists such as Sean Paul through the label's deals with Warner Music Group's Atlantic Records and Virgin Music Canada. The label is often also accredited with having increased the popularity of the now globally recognized Elephant Man, also known as the 'Energy God' or 'Ele', through a deal with Bad Boy Records. VP Records has acquired the slogan "Miles Ahead in Reggae Music" to signify that they could be considered to be the future of music that derives from the Caribbean. In addition to reggae, VP is also known for dancehall, soca, and reggaeton music. VP also releases a series of Riddim Driven albums, which feature various artists tracks using the same rhythm. The Biggest Reggae One-Drop Anthems is a series of CD reggae compilations that began in 2005 released by Greensleeves Records; Greensleeves was acquired by VP in 2008, and with Greensleeves' catalogue of over 12,000 songs, VP became the largest reggae label and publisher in the world. VP has also issued the compilations series Strictly the Best, which has now reached over 50 volumes.

VP Records has been awarded Billboards "Best Independent Label" for two consecutive years (2002 and 2003), and has received the award for "Best Reggae Imprint Label" for three consecutive years. VP was also nominated for Best Independent Reggae Label at the 2003 Billboard Hip-Hop and R&B awards, and had been mentioned and featured in publications such as Vibe magazine, New York Times, Los Angeles Times, Billboard, and Time magazine.

Vincent Chin died in 2003. The label is now run by the Chins' sons Randy and Christopher, while Patricia Chin continues to assist with the maintenance of her late husband's company as well. In 2007, VP Records began re-issuing classic albums from the 1970s and 1980s on the 17 North Parade label, the address of Randy's Studio, where it all began.

Artists
 Alborosie
 Beres Hammond
 Busy Signal
 Christopher Martin
 Gyptian
 Jah Cure
 Jah9
 Jahvillani
 Queen Ifrica
 Raging Fyah
 Richie Spice
 Romain Virgo
 Spice

Former artistsA Admiral Bailey
 Admiral Tibet
 Alpha Blondy
 Ambelique
 Anthony B
 Anthony Red Rose
 Assassin
 Augustus PabloB Baby Wayne
 Barrington Levy
 Beenie Man
 Bobby Digital
 Bounty Killer
 Brian and Tony Gold
 Buccaneer
 Buju Banton
 Bunji Garlin
 Bushman
 Byron LeeC Capleton
 Carlene Davis
 Chevelle Franklyn
 Chaka Demus
 Chezidek
 Cutty Ranks
 CultureD Daddy Screw
 Da'Ville
 Dean Fraser
 Dennis Brown
 Denroy Morgan
 Dirtsman
 Don Campbell
 Duane StephensonE Elephant Man
 EtanaF Fay-Ann Lyons
 Foxy Brown
 Flourgon
 Frankie Paul
 Freddie McGregorG Garnett Silk
 Gentleman
 General Degree
 George Nooks
 Ghost
 Glen Washington
 Gregory Isaacs
 Gussie ClarkeH Half Pint
 Henry "Junjo" LawesI Inner Circle
 I WayneJ Jacob Miller
 Jigsy King
 John Holt
 Johnny Osbourne
 Junior Kelly
 Junior Tucker
 J.C. LodgeK Kashief Lindo
 King Jammy
 KiprichL Lady Saw
 Leroy Sibbles
 Lieutenant Stitchie
 Luciano
 Lukie DM Mad Cobra
 Marcia Griffiths
 Mavado
 Maxi Priest
 Merciless
 Mighty Diamonds
 Michigan & Smiley
 Mikey Spice
 Morgan Heritage
 Mr. Lexx
 Mr. VegasN Nadine Sutherland
 NinjamanOP Papa San
 Pam Hall
 Pinchers QR Red Dragon
 Ras Shiloh
 Richie StephensS Sanchez
 Sasha
 Screwdriver
 Sean Paul
 Shabba Ranks
 Shaggy
 Sharon Forrester
 Simpleton
 Singing Melody
 Spanner Banner
 Spragga Benz
 Sugar MinottT Tanto Metro
 Tanto Metro and Devonte
 Tanya Stephens
 Terror Fabulous
 Thriller U
 Tiger
 Tinga Stewart
 Tony Rebel
 Turbulence
 T.O.K.UV VoicemailW Warrior King
 Wayne Wonder
 Winston RileyXY Yellowman
 Yami BoloZ'
 Zap Pow

VP Associated Label Group
VP Associated Label Group (VPAL) is a subsidiary of VP Records that allows independent artists to access VP Records' distribution channel, allowing them broader visibility.

See also

 List of record labels

References

External links
 
 Discography at Discogs
 
 

American independent record labels
Reggae record labels
New York (state) record labels
Record labels established in 1979